Bordereau may also refer to:
 Renée Bordereau, a French female soldier
 An important document in the Dreyfus Affair
 A detailed statement provided by a reinsured company to a Reinsurance company